The Yacuma River is a river in Bolivia, which feeds into the Mamoré River and ultimately into the Amazon. The headwaters of the Yacuma are within the Pilón Lajas Biosphere Reserve and Communal Lands.

The upper parts are accessible through Reyes.

References 

Rivers of Beni Department